Craig Shapiro is a television and film producer, writer and director.

Filmography
 Breakfast with Einstein (1998) – director
 Passport to Paris (1999) – writer
 Our Lips Are Sealed (2000) – writer, director
 Winning London (2001) – director
 The Challenge (2003) – director
 Dr. Dolittle: Tail to the Chief (2008) – director

Television
 The Troop (2010) – writer
 Miami Medical (2010) – writer
 Necessary Roughness (2011–13) – creator, executive producer, writer, director
 Pan Am (2012) – writer
 Girlfriends' Guide to Divorce (2014–15) – executive producer, writer
 Extant (2015) – showrunner, executive producer, writer
 Bull (2016) – writer
 Salvation (2017–18) – creator, showrunner, executive producer, writer
 Charmed (2019–present) – showrunner, executive producer, writer, director

References

External links
 

American film directors
American film producers
American male screenwriters
Living people
Year of birth missing (living people)